Pierfranco Pastore (April 21, 1927 – August 30, 2015) was a Roman Catholic bishop. He was born in Varallo Sesia.

Ordained to the priesthood in 1950, Pastore was appointed secretary of the Pontifical Council for Social Communications in 1984. In 1996, Pastore was ordained bishop in the titular see of Forontoniana retiring in 2003.

Notes

1927 births
2015 deaths
20th-century Italian Roman Catholic bishops
People from Varallo Sesia
21st-century Italian Roman Catholic bishops